Eugene Hecht (born 2 December 1938 in New York City) is an American physicist and author of a standard work in optics.

Hecht studied at New York University (B.S. in E.P. 1960), Rutgers University (M. Sc. 1963), Adelphi University (Ph.D. 1967). During his graduate study he worked at Radio Corporation of America.  He became interested in optics in the 1960s and began writing about it in 1970, e.g., polarization.
Adelphi University hired Hecht to teach and he became professor in 1978 and he retired in 2021.

Hecht challenged the notion of potential energy in 2003. The elusive nature of a universal definition of energy was argued by Hecht in a letter to the editor of The Physics Teacher in 2004. Then in 2006 he wrote "There is no really good definition of mass". He continued with the topic in 2011 and 2016.

Eugene Hecht is also widely published authority on George E. Ohr and American art pottery as well as a founding member of the American Ceramic Arts Society.

Books
His first textbook on optics was co-authored with Alfred Zajac, a colleague at Adelphi, in 1974 For the second edition of Optics in 1987 Hecht was the sole author.

In 1975 Hecht wrote the text Theory and Problems of Optics for Schaum's Outlines. Brooks/Cole published Physics:Calculus in 1996 in which reviewers "found something intriguing on every page". Hecht contributed to a celebrationof potter George Ohr after his workshop was consumed in fire.

References

 Eugene Hecht at ResearchGate

1938 births
Adelphi University faculty
Optical physicists
Living people
New York University alumni
Rutgers University alumni